The Court is an American legal drama television series created by Oliver Goldstick and Tom Schulman that aired on ABC from March 26 until April 9, 2002.

Premise
The newly appointed Supreme Court Justice Kate Nolan struggles her way through the political aspects of her occupation.

Cast
Sally Field as Justice Kate Nolan
Craig Bierko as Harlan Brandt
Christina Hendricks as Betsy Tyler
Pat Hingle as Chief Justice Townsend
Miguel Sandoval as Justice Martinez
Chris Sarandon as Justice Vorhees
Diahann Carroll as Justice DeSett
Harry Northup as Justice Fitzsimmons
Alfred Dennis as Justice Bernstein
Nicole DeHuff as Alexis Cameron
Hill Harper as Christopher Bell
Josh Radnor as Dylan Hirsch

Episodes

References

External links
 

2002 American television series debuts
2002 American television series endings
2000s American legal television series
English-language television shows
American Broadcasting Company original programming
Television series by Warner Bros. Television Studios
Television shows set in Washington, D.C.